HMS Arundel was a 32-gun fifth rate built by Thomas Ellis of Shoreham in 1694/95. After commissioning she was used as a convoy escort, trade protection and counter piracy operations. Her main areas of operation were Irish Waters, the English Channel and convoy escorts to Newfoundland and the West Indies. She was sold in June 1713.

She was the first vessel to carry the name Arundel in the English and Royal Navy.

Construction and Specifications
She was ordered on 16 February 1694 to be built under contract by Mr. Flint of Plymouth. She was launched on 20 April 1695. Her builder’s measure tonnage was calculated as 377 tons (burthen).

The gun armament initially was four demi-culverins on the lower deck (LD) with two pair of guns per side. The upper deck (UD) battery would consist of between twenty and twenty-two 6-pounder guns with ten or eleven guns per side. The gun battery would be completed by four 4-pounder guns on the quarterdeck (QD) with two to three guns per side.

Commissioned Service 1695-1713
HMS Arundel was commissioned in 1695 under the command of Captain William Higgins for service in New England. Captain Higgins died on 16 June 1698. After his passing Captain Josiah Crow took command and went to Newfoundland in 1699 then on to North America and the West Indies in 1700. 1702 saw Captain John Ward take command for service in Irish Waters. On 4 March she was under Captain Unton Dering (until his death on 16 November 1706). He was followed by Captain Joseph Winder from 1 December 1706 until 1710. both served in Irish Waters. in 1709 she was assigned to the English Channel then went to the West Indies for convoy service in 1710. On 25 January she was under the command of Captain Andrew Douglas sailing with a convoy to Newfound in 1711. On her return she was assigned to the English Channel.

Disposition
She was sold to John Mackpheadras for 315 by Admiralty Order (AO) 11 June 1713.

Notes

Citations

References

 Winfield (2009), British Warships in the Age of Sail (1603 – 1714), by Rif Winfield, published by Seaforth Publishing, England © 2009, EPUB 
 Colledge (2020), Ships of the Royal Navy, by J.J. Colledge, revised and updated by Lt Cdr Ben Warlow and Steve Bush, published by Seaforth Publishing, Barnsley, Great Britain, © 2020, EPUB 
 Lavery (1989), The Arming and Fitting of English Ships of War 1600 - 1815, by Brian Lavery, published by US Naval Institute Press © Brian Lavery 1989, Part V Guns, Type of Guns
 Clowes (1898), The Royal Navy, A History from the Earliest Times to the Present (Vol. II). London. England: Sampson Low, Marston & Company, © 1898

 

Frigates of the Royal Navy
Ships of the Royal Navy
1690s ships